Andrew Ducat (15 February 1886 – 23 July 1942) was an England and Surrey cricketer and an England footballer, being one of an elite group to have represented their country in both sports. He died while batting at Lord's.

Early life
Ducat was born in Brixton, London, but grew up in Southend. The cricket writer David Foot said his surname was "pronounced 'Dewkitt' by the family, 'Duckett' on the football terraces". In the First World War, he served in the Royal Garrison Artillery, from 1915, and was promoted to Company Quartermaster Sergeant in 1916 until being discharged due to 'disability' in 1919.

Cricket career
Ducat joined the ground staff at The Oval in 1906, and soon became a regular member of the Surrey county team, playing alongside Tom Hayward, Jack Hobbs and Ernest Hayes. Standing 5'10" high, he was a powerful, forcing batsman, and made 52 centuries for Surrey, including 306 not out in 280 minutes against the Oxford University in 1919. He was also one of the Wisden Cricketers of the Year in 1920. He missed many matches due to injury: a broken leg in 1912 almost ended his career, and he missed the 1924 season after breaking his arm in the nets. In 1928, he made 994 runs in less than six weeks, including centuries in four successive matches.

He played in only one Test, the 3rd Test against Australia at Headingley in 1921 when he was unlucky to only make 3 and 2. He was "doubly" out in the first innings: his bat disintegrated when he played a ball bowled by Ted McDonald, the ball looping to slip where it was caught, and part of the bat dislodging a bail. He was given out caught rather than hit wicket.

Football career

Ducat also had a successful football career. He started out playing for non-league Southend Athletic before joining First Division Woolwich Arsenal in 1905.

He made his Arsenal debut on 11 February 1905, in a 2–0 win against Blackburn Rovers, playing at centre forward. After losing his place in 1906–07, he was later switched to right half and became a regular in 1907–08 and 1908–09. During his time at Arsenal, he won three caps for England, with his debut coming against Ireland in Belfast on 12 February 1910; England won 6–1. On his second appearance for England, against Wales on 14 March the same year, Ducat scored the only goal in a 1–0 win.

Ducat's ability and success with England brought attention from bigger clubs than Arsenal, who were at the time going through a financial crisis. Eventually, he was sold for £1,000 to England's most successful club Aston Villa in 1912, having played 188 matches and scored 21 goals for Arsenal. After suffering a broken leg in his first season at Villa, he recovered to become a stalwart in the side, captaining Villa to their sixth FA Cup win in 1919–20, beating Huddersfield Town. He also regained his England place; having not played since 1910, he won three more caps during 1920, the last coming in a 2–0 win against Ireland at Roker Park on 23 October 1920, bringing his total number of England appearances to six.

He moved to Fulham in 1921, and upon his retirement from playing in 1924, he succeeded Phil Kelso (his former boss at Arsenal) as Fulham manager. However, the Cottagers struggled with Ducat in charge, finishing 12th and 19th in the Second Division during the two seasons he was at the helm. He was sacked in 1926. After his departure from Fulham, he was given permission by the FA to play football for the Casuals.

Personal life

Ducat married on 20 June 1914 at St Stephen's Church, Hounslow, Vera Barbour, daughter of Aston Villa footballer Horace Barbour. They had one daughter together.

Retirement and death

After retiring from cricket in 1931, Ducat became a cricket coach at Eton College until his death. He was also a sports reporter for the Daily Sketch. He died suddenly in 1942 during a game at Lord's Cricket Ground of an apparent heart attack after lunch whilst playing in a wartime cricket match between teams from his unit of the Home Guard from Surrey against another from Sussex. The match was immediately abandoned as a mark of respect for Ducat. He was aged 56, and he is the only person to have died while playing in a match at Lord's. He was cremated at Golders Green Crematorium.

See also 
 List of fatalities while playing cricket

References

External links
 
 Not out ... dead, Cricinfo, 4 December 2004
 Fulham FC article on Andy Ducat
 Scorecard for his final match – 29 not out

1886 births
1942 deaths
Footballers from Brixton
British Home Guard soldiers
Arsenal F.C. players
Aston Villa F.C. players
Casuals F.C. players
England international footballers
England Test cricketers
English cricketers
English football managers
English footballers
Fulham F.C. managers
Fulham F.C. players
Surrey cricketers
Wisden Cricketers of the Year
Players cricketers
Marylebone Cricket Club cricketers
Cricket deaths
Association football forwards
English cricketers of 1919 to 1945
Players of the South cricketers
P. F. Warner's XI cricketers
FA Cup Final players
Royal Garrison Artillery soldiers
British Army personnel of World War I
Military personnel from London